This is a list of Superfund sites in American Samoa designated under the Comprehensive Environmental Response, Compensation, and Liability Act (CERCLA) environmental law.  The CERCLA federal law of 1980 authorized the United States Environmental Protection Agency (EPA) to create a list of polluted locations requiring a long-term response to clean up hazardous material contaminations.

These locations are known as Superfund sites, and are placed on the National Priorities List (NPL).  The NPL guides the EPA in "determining which sites warrant further investigation" for environmental remediation.  As of May 7, 2020 there were no Superfund sites on the National Priorities List in American Samoa.  No additional sites are currently proposed for entry on the list.  One site has been cleaned up and removed from the list.

See also
List of Superfund sites in the United States
List of environmental issues
List of waste types
TOXMAP

References

External links
EPA list of current Superfund sites in American Samoa
EPA list of deleted Superfund sites in American Samoa

American Samoa
Environment of American Samoa
Superfund